Jim Meddick (born August 1961) is an American cartoonist.

While attending Washington University in St. Louis, he won the Chicago Tribune Student Cartoonist Contest for a strip named Paperback Writer. After graduating, in 1983 he became a political cartoonist. In 1985, he created the comic strip Robotman, now known as Monty. Meddick did not own the Robotman property, whereas he created and owns the Monty character. He lives in New York City with his wife.

References

External links
Short bio (with picture) at the National Cartoonists Society
Monty website
Jim Meddick's website

1961 births
Living people
American comic strip cartoonists
Washington University in St. Louis alumni